Hot Box (or simply Box) is a non-contact team sport which is similar to ultimate, but played on a smaller field and with fewer players.  Like ultimate, the object of the game is to score points by passing the disc into the end zone; however, in Hot Box there is generally only one end zone and it is of much smaller size than an Ultimate end zone.  In this way, hot box is a "half-court" variant of ultimate.  Because of these reduced requirements, it is often played when not enough players are available to play ultimate.

Rules

For the most part, hot box follows the rules of play of ultimate.  The major differences are:
 Team size: Box is usually played with two teams of two to four players.
 Field of play: Box is played on a square field of approximately 40 yards on a side.  A single square end zone, approximately five feet on a side, forms the center of the field.  Each square is marked with four cones on the corners.
 Turnovers: There is no out-of-bounds in box.  If the disc is turned over (dropped, intercepted, etc.) inside the outer square, the team which is now on offense must clear the disc by completing a pass outside the outer box before they may score a goal.
 Goals: When a goal is scored, the scoring team retains possession.  They must clear the disc before they may score again.  It is customary for there to be a stoppage of play when a goal is scored, but in some circles the scoring team may immediately continue play.
 No Fouls: Unlike ultimate, box is usually played more like pickup basketball, with some amount of physical contact allowed in and around the box area.  Normal fouls & violations in ultimate (picks, strips, travel, contact) are typically not called.  Some games of box also allow for intentional strips, and hard (though still usually friendly) contact.

Variants

Many variations on the rules of hot box exist.  Common variants include changing the dimensions of the field, using a circle instead of a square for the clear line, a stall count of 5 or 7 (instead of 10), and a "no poaching" clause which prevents defenders from guarding the endzone instead of their assigned player.

Some variant games also exist. Double box involves a short rectangular field with two small end zones rather than one; there is no clearing line, but when a team gains possession of the disc after a turnover they must attack the end zone that their opponents were not. A variant originated in Washington, DC, Boot-Box, combines Double box with the cone hitting game, Durango Boot. Two end zones are formed with a square of four cones. Before scoring a team must complete a pass across a mid line. They can then score at either end zone. One point is scored for each cone knocked over. Catching a disc and landing in an end zone scores 3 points. Games are played to 15. Invalidimate was developed in the UK as a way to include injured players in practice; the "invalid" stands in the goal and is the target receiver for both teams. Two invalids can also be used in double box, with the additional rule that every player on a team must touch the disc (including the defensive invalid) before the offensive invalid can catch a scoring throw.

A drinking variation called Beer Box was invented at Case Western Reserve University in Cleveland, OH. Beer Box is similar to the original half-court Box with one larger square and an inner, smaller endzone square, but this game also includes drinking cans of alcohol throughout the course of the game. For setup, the outer square is 15 yards wide on each side and the inner endzone square is 2 yard on each side. For each outer cone, a can of alcohol is placed underneath.  Once any player with the disc is within reach of an outer cone, play is paused momentarily as said player is allowed to drink for 3 counts. After 3 counts, the can is placed back under the cone and play resumes.  If the offensive player finishes the can at any point during the game, the marking defender must remove themselves from the game and complete a task, creating a power play for the offensive team. Once the marking defender performs a task by the designated Task Master and replaces the empty can with a brand new one, that player may enter the field of play. Similar to standard box, a goal is scored once the offensive team caught a pass in the endzone. However, once a goal is scored, play is paused while the defender guarding the scoring receiver must drink for 10 counts from the designated side beer area.

References

Team sports
Flying disc games